For the commune of Algiers, see Aïn Benian, Algiers

Aïn Benian is a town in northern Algeria.

References

External links

Communes of Aïn Defla Province